Ales is a small town in the province of Oristano on the island of Sardinia in the Mediterranean Sea. It lies on the eastern slopes of Mount Arci. This area is the only Sardinian source of obsidian.

Together with the town of Terralba, Ales forms the Roman Catholic diocese of Ales-Terralba. Its current  bishop is Giovanni Dettori. Ales Cathedral, dedicated to Saint Peter, is the bishop's seat.

Antonio Gramsci and Fernando Atzori were born in Ales.

The nearest international airport is in Cagliari, at roughly  distance.

References 

 Official website  
 Complete tourist info for trip in Ales (Sardinia)
 Information and statistics on Italian Regions, Provinces and Municipalities

Cities and towns in Sardinia